Analytica is a consulting and information technology firm serving US public and private sector enterprises focused on national security, law enforcement, health care and financial services.  The company specializes in implementing on-premises and cloud computing solutions for information management, Cyber security, big data, data analytics, and business intelligence.  Analytica is a member of NYU Governance Lab's Open Data 500 Project, as one of 500 U.S. companies profiled for their involvement in implementing Open Data initiatives for public sector organizations to address requirements under the Digital Accountability and Transparency Act (“DATA Act”).

Headquartered in Washington DC, the company earned $15 million in revenue and is ranked as the 4th fastest-growing private IT Services firm and the 63rd fastest-growing private small business in the United States according to Inc Magazine. Analytica is a private, self-funded company.

Analytica is a SBA Certified 8(a) business.

Services

Software & Systems Engineering 

 DevOps and DevSecOps
Enterprise Architecture
Rapid Prototyping
Open Source Development
Systems Engineering and Integration
Agile Product Development
Data-Driven Systems Engineering

Analytics & Visualization 

 Data Science
 Data Visualization
Business Intelligence Solutions
Statistical Modeling & Validation
Predictive Analytics
Machine Learning, Artificial Intelligence
Program Integrity Support
GIS Mapping Solutions
Natural Language Processing & Analytics

Information & Data Management 
 Data Warehousing
 Master Data Management
Cloud and Big Data Architecture
Data Modeling and Management
ETL Development
Blockchain Development
Open Data Support
Content Management Systems
Customer Relationship Management
Storage and Backup administration

Management Consulting 

 Change Management
Human Centered Design
Mission Support Services
Business Process Management
Business Transformation Services
Financial Analysis Services
Human Capital Services
Performance Management
Data Governance

Health 

 Model Development and Analysis
 Program Integrity Analytics and Support
 Clinical Quality Measures
System Integration 
Medical Record Reviews

Agile Project Management 
Analytica provides Agile Project Management using Agile SAFe and Scrum methodologies across health, civilian and national security; uses  techniques such as PMI, PMBOK, ISO, ITIL and CMMI,. Analytica makes planning, offers execution, provides tracking and reporting.

References

External links
Analytica Official Website

Business intelligence companies
Software companies based in Washington, D.C.
Organizations based in Washington, D.C.
Analytics
Software companies of the United States